Vosmoye Marta is a rural locality (a settlement) in Krasnooktyabrskoye Rural Settlement, Sredneakhtubinsky District, Volgograd Oblast, Russia. The population was 19 as of 2010.

Geography 
Vosmoye Marta is located 81 km northeast of Srednyaya Akhtuba (the district's administrative centre) by road. Krasny Oktyabr is the nearest rural locality.

References 

Rural localities in Sredneakhtubinsky District